is a Japanese alpine ski racer. Ando specializes in the technical events of Slalom and Giant slalom. Ando made her World Cup debut on 25 October 2014.

Career
Ando made her World Cup debut on 25 October 2014 in the Sölden Giant slalom, and she failed to qualify for the second run, finishing in 32nd place. She competed for Japan at the FIS Alpine World Ski Championships 2017 in St. Moritz, Switzerland. She finished 35th in the Giant slalom and failed to finish the first run of the Slalom.

World Cup results

* Season still in progress.

World Championship results

References

External links
 
 Asa Ando World Cup standings at the International Ski Federation
 

1996 births
Japanese female alpine skiers
Living people
Alpine skiers at the 2018 Winter Olympics
Alpine skiers at the 2022 Winter Olympics
Olympic alpine skiers of Japan
Asian Games medalists in alpine skiing
Asian Games silver medalists for Japan
Alpine skiers at the 2017 Asian Winter Games
Medalists at the 2017 Asian Winter Games
Universiade gold medalists for Japan
Universiade bronze medalists for Japan
Universiade medalists in alpine skiing
Competitors at the 2017 Winter Universiade
21st-century Japanese women